Svetlana Mikhailovna Morgunova   (born March 7, 1940) is an announcer of the Soviet Central Television since 1961, television and radio host.

She worked in different genres: she conducted the informational TV program Vremya, acquainted the audience with the program of television programs, and also conducted many editions of the musical entertainment program Little Blue Light.

Awards and honours
 Honored Artist of the RSFSR (1978)
 People's Artist of Russia (2000)
 Order of Friendship (2011) for great achievements in the development of domestic broadcasting and many years of fruitful activity

References

External links

Svetlana Morgunova at the kino-teatr.ru
 Легендарная телеведущая Светлана Моргунова не девочка

1940 births
Soviet television presenters
Russian television presenters
Russian women television presenters
Russian radio presenters
Russian women radio presenters
Radio and television announcers
Living people
People's Artists of Russia
Honored Artists of the RSFSR
20th-century Russian women